Pendeen Vau is a fogou on the Cornish coast of England, near the village of Pendeen. It is situated at Pendeen (Manor) farm, once the home of the renowned historian William Borlase about half a mile from Pendeen Lighthouse. As the fogou is on private land, it is only accessible by asking permission at Pendeen Manor farm.

Notes

Archaeological sites in Cornwall
Fogous